Ian Sinfield (born 7 April 1977) is a former professional rugby league footballer who played in the 2000s. He played at representative level for Scotland, and at club level for Oldham (Heritage № 1071) (two spells), Rochdale Hornets (two spells), Keighley and Swinton Lions.

International honours
Ian Sinfield won three caps in 2004–06 for Scotland while at Swinton.

Genealogical information
Ian Sinfield is the older brother of the rugby league footballer, Kevin Sinfield.

References

1977 births
Living people
English rugby league players
Keighley Cougars players
Oldham R.L.F.C. players
Rochdale Hornets players
Rugby league players from Oldham
Scotland national rugby league team players
Swinton Lions players